Peter Kwong (1941–2017) was a professor of Asian American studies and urban affairs and planning at Hunter College in New York City, as well as a professor of sociology at the Graduate Center of the City University of New York.

Biography
Born in Chungking, China, he was a pioneer in Asian American studies, a leading scholar of immigration, and an award-winning journalist and filmmaker of Chinese descent. He was widely recognized for his passionate commitment to human rights and social justice.
His best known scholarly work is on Chinese Americans and on modern Chinese politics. His books include:
Chinese America: The Untold Story of America’s Oldest New Community;
Chinese Americans: An Immigrant Experience , co-authored with his wife, Chinese historian Dusanka Miscevic.;
Forbidden Workers: Illegal Chinese Immigrants and American Labor;
 The New Chinatown;
Chinatown, New York: Labor and Politics, 1930-1950.

He was a frequent contributor to The Nation and the International Herald Tribune and wrote a bi-weekly column on Asia, syndicated worldwide by Agence Global. His exposés of Chinese drug syndicates and Los Angeles racial riots were nominated for the Pulitzer Prize. Kwong was also a documentary filmmaker, a recipient of a CINE Golden Eagle Award, and most recently a co-producer of China's Unnatural Disaster: The Tears of Sichuan Province for HBO, which was nominated for an Academy Award in 2010.  His 1980 television film, “Third Avenue: Only the Strong Survive,” won an Emmy Award.

See also
 Chinese Americans in New York City

References 

1941 births
2017 deaths
Hunter College faculty
Graduate Center, CUNY faculty
American academics of Chinese descent
Writers from Chongqing